Drummond is a town in Granite County, Montana, United States. The population was 272 at the 2020 census.

Geography
Drummond is located at  (46.667983, -113.146355). The town can be accessed via exits 153 and 154 on Interstate 90. It is just north of the Clark Fork River.

History 

The Northern Pacific Railroad arrived in 1883. They changed the town name from Edwardsville to Drummond, after either a Northern Pacific engineer or Hugh Drummond, a local trapper.

Mayor Gail Leeper is known for her long tenure. Elected to the office in 1993, Leeper is seeking her 7th term as Mayor in 2017.

Demographics

2010 census
As of the census of 2010, there were 309 people, 143 households, and 84 families residing in the town. The racial makeup of the town was 97.7% White (U.S. Census)], 0.3% African American, 0.3% Native American, and 1.6% from two or more races. Hispanic or Latino of any race were 1.6% of the population.

There were 143 households, of which 21.7% had children under the age of 18 living with them, 47.6% were married couples living together, 7.0% had a female householder with no husband present, 4.2% had a male householder with no wife present, and 41.3% were non-families. 38.5% of all households were made up of individuals, and 13.3% had someone living alone who was 65 years of age or older. The average household size was 2.11 and the average family size was 2.80.

The median age in the town was 46.9 years. 19.1% of residents were under the age of 18; 7.1% were between the ages of 18 and 24; 18.5% were from 25 to 44; 32% were from 45 to 64; and 23.3% were 65 years of age or older.  The gender makeup of the town was 48.5% male and 51.5% female.

2000 census
As of the census of 2000, there were 318 people, 140 households, and 84 families residing in the town. The population density was 547.8 people per square mile (211.7/km2). There were 172 housing units at an average density of 296.3 per square mile (114.5/km2). The racial makeup of the town was 96.54% White, 1.57% Native American, 0.31% from other races, and 1.57% from two or more races. Hispanic or Latino of any race were 0.94% of the population.

There were 140 households, out of which 30.7% had children under the age of 18 living with them, 45.0% were married couples living together, 11.4% had a female householder with no husband present, and 39.3% were non-families. 35.0% of all households were made up of individuals, and 9.3% had someone living alone who was 65 years of age or older. The average household size was 2.27 and the average family size was 2.93.

In the town, the population was spread out, with 28.6% under the age of 18, 5.3% from 18 to 24, 27.0% from 25 to 44, 25.8% from 45 to 64, and 13.2% who were 65 years of age or older. The median age was 38 years. For every 100 females there were 101.3 males. For every 100 females age 18 and over, there were 100.9 males.

The median income for a household in the town was $26,500, and the median income for a family was $32,841. Males had a median income of $30,625 versus $16,563 for females. The per capita income for the town was $14,213. About 6.6% of families and 13.6% of the population were below the poverty line, including 15.0% of those under age 18 and 5.0% of those age 65 or over.

Climate
According to the Köppen Climate Classification system, Drummond has a semi-arid climate, abbreviated "BSk" on climate maps.

Education
Drummond Public Schools provides education. Drummond High School's team name is the Trojans.

The Drummond School and Community Library serves the town.

See also
 List of cities and towns in Montana
 Atlantic Cable Quartz Lode

References

External links

Towns in Granite County, Montana